329th may refer to:

329th Armament Systems Group, inactive United States Air Force unit, inactivated in 2007
329th Combat Crew Training Squadron, inactive United States Air Force unit
329th Fighter-Interceptor Squadron, inactive United States Air Force unit
329th Infantry Regiment (United States), unit of the United States Army during World War II

See also
329 (number)
329, the year 329 (CCCXXIX) of the Julian calendar
329 BC